The Muralla urbana is a fort in Marbella, southern Spain. It was built in the 10th century, and contained the old Arab medina, which today corresponds to the old part of the city. The fort was accessible through three entrances: the Puerta de Ronda, the Puerta de Málaga and the Puerta del Mar, and was composed of at least 20 towers. Currently, there are remains of the fort, though part of the wall has been restored.

References
Page at Castillosnet.org

Buildings and structures completed in the 11th century
Buildings and structures in Marbella
Castles in Andalusia
Forts in Spain